Apalacris is a genus of grasshoppers in the family Acrididae and subfamily Coptacrinae. The recorded distribution of species includes: India, Indo-China and Malesia.

Species
The Catalogue of Life lists:
Apalacris annulipes Bolívar, 1890
Apalacris antennata Liang, 1988
Apalacris celebensis Willemse, 1936
Apalacris cingulatipes Bolívar, 1898
Apalacris contracta Walker, 1870
Apalacris cyanoptera Stål, 1877
Apalacris dupanglingensis Zheng & Fu, 2005
Apalacris eminifronta Niu & Zheng, 2016
Apalacris gracilis Willemse, 1936
Apalacris incompleta Willemse, 1936
Apalacris maculifemura (Lin & Zheng, 2014)
Apalacris monticola Miller, 1932
Apalacris nigrogeniculata Bi, 1984
Apalacris pendleburyi Miller, 1932
Apalacris splendens Willemse, 1930
Apalacris tonkinensis Ramme, 1941
Apalacris varicornis Walker, 1870 - type species (India, Indo-China)
Apalacris viridis Huang & Xia, 1985
Apalacris xizangensis Bi, 1984

References

Acrididae genera
Invertebrates of Southeast Asia